On 13 February 2008, the Parliament of Australia issued a formal apology to Indigenous Australians for forced removals of Australian Indigenous children (often referred to as the Stolen Generations) from their families by Australian federal and state government agencies. The apology was delivered by Prime Minister Kevin Rudd, and is also referred to as the National Apology, or simply The Apology.

Background

Howard Government

The Bringing Them Home (1997) report commissioned by the Keating Labor Government recommended an official apology be offered by the Australian Government for past government welfare policies which had separated children from parents on racial grounds. Keating's Liberal successor John Howard received the report, but eschewed use of the term "sorry", believing a Parliamentary "apology" would imply "intergenerational guilt". He instead moved to draft a Parliamentary "Motion of Reconciliation", in consultation with Democrat Senator Aden Ridgeway, the only Aboriginal person then sitting in the federal parliament.

On Thursday 26 August 1999, Howard moved the Motion of Reconciliation expressing "deep and sincere regret that indigenous Australians suffered injustices under the practices of past generations, and for the hurt and trauma that many indigenous people continue to feel as a consequence of those practices" and dedicating Parliament to the "cause of reconciliation" for historic mistreatment of Indigenous Australians as the "most blemished chapter" in Australian history.

From the outset, the Labor opposition, led by Kim Beazley, argued the need for an "apology". Following Howard's Motion of Reconciliation, Beazley moved to replace the motion of regret with an unreserved apology, but was unsuccessful. The Liberal-National Howard Government maintained its opposition to an "apology" for the remainder of its term in office (1996-2007).

 Election of the Rudd Government

After the 2007 election of the Rudd Government, Labor Prime Minister Kevin Rudd announced on 11 December 2007 that the government would make an apology to Indigenous Australians, the wording of which would be decided in consultation with Aboriginal leaders.

The Liberal Party opposition was split on the issue. Its leader Brendan Nelson initially said that an apology would risk encouraging a "culture of guilt" in Australia. However, support for an apology was expressed by other senior Liberals, such as Malcolm Turnbull, Peter Costello, Bill Heffernan, and former Liberal Prime Minister Malcolm Fraser. Former Liberal minister Judi Moylan said: "I think as a nation we owe an apology. We shouldn't be thinking about it as an individual apology — it's an apology that is coming from the nation state because it was governments that did these things." Nelson later said that he supported the government apology. Following a party meeting, the Liberal Party as a whole expressed its support for an apology, and it achieved bipartisan consensus. Nelson stated: "I, on behalf of the Coalition, of the alternative government of Australia, are providing in-principle support for the offer of an apology to the forcibly removed generations of Aboriginal children."

Lyn Austin, chairwoman of Stolen Generations Victoria, expressed why she believed an apology was necessary, recounting her experiences as a stolen child:
I thought I was being taken just for a few days. I can recall seeing my mother standing on the side of the road with her head in her hands, crying, and me in the black FJ Holden wondering why she was so upset. A few hundred words can't fix this all but it's an important start and it's a beginning[...]
I see myself as that little girl, crying myself to sleep at night, crying and wishing I could go home to my family. Everything's gone, the loss of your culture, the loss of your family, all these things have a big impact.

The apology

At 9:30am on 13 February 2008, Rudd presented the apology to Indigenous Australians as a motion to be voted on by the house. It has since been referred to as the National Apology, or simply The Apology.

The form of the apology was as follows:

The text of the apology did not refer to compensation to Aboriginal people as a whole, nor to members of the Stolen Generations specifically. Rudd followed the apology with a 20-minute speech to the house about the need for this action.

Opposition leader's reply

Liberal Opposition Leader Dr Brendan Nelson rose to offer bi-partisan support for the Apology:

Nelson' speech also expressed empathy for how the often "good intentions" of the public servants who carried out the removal of children had led to unintended consequences

His speech also referred to the "under-policing" of child welfare in Aboriginal communities, as well as a host of social ills blighting the lives of Aboriginal people.

The Alice Springs Crown Prosecutor Nanette Rogers with great courage revealed to the nation in 2006 the case of a four-year-old girl drowned while being raped by a teenager who had been sniffing petrol. She told us of the two children – one a baby – sexually assaulted by two men while their mothers were off drinking alcohol. Another baby was stabbed by a man trying to kill her mother.

After the ceremony, the House of Representatives unanimously adopted the proposed apology motion. Six members of Nelson's opposition caucus — Don Randall, Sophie Mirabella, Dennis Jensen, Wilson Tuckey, Luke Simpkins, and Alby Schultz — left the House in protest at the apology. Peter Dutton was the only Opposition front bencher to abstain from the apology.

 Reaction

The conclusion of Dr Nelson's Speech was met with applause from Members and the public gallery and further bipartisan scenes as the Prime Minister and Leader of the Opposition met with representatives of Australia’s Indigenous peoples in the distinguished visitors gallery. Former prime ministers Gough Whitlam, Malcolm Fraser and Paul Keating all expressed appreciation for Dr Nelson's role. Whitlam called the speech "very good" and Keating said Nelson "picked up the spirit of the day".

However, outside the chamber, reactions were less bi-partisan and Nelson's speech received mixed reactions and some criticism. In the Great Hall of Parliament, members of the audience (including Kevin Rudd's Press Secretary and Media Advisor) began a slow clap and turned their backs during Dr Nelson's speech (Rudd later instructed his advisors to apologise to Dr Nelson). In Melbourne's Federation Square, Labor's Barry Jones joined others in turning their backs. In Perth, people booed and jeered until the screen was switched off. There were similar reactions and walk-outs in Sydney and elsewhere. Academic Lowitja O'Donoghue objected to Nelson's discussion of domestic violence and pedophilia, and said "I think Brendan Nelson actually spoilt it today", and Olympian (and future Labor Senator) Nova Peris-Kneebone also expressed disappointment.

Reception and response

The government's apology and his speech were widely applauded among both Indigenous Australians and the non-indigenous general public.

Dr. Tom Calma, Aboriginal and Torres Strait Islander Social Justice Commissioner of the Australian Human Rights and Equal Opportunity Commission, gave a speech formally responding to the government's apology. Calma thanked the Parliament for acknowledging and paying respects to the Stolen Generations, stating "By acknowledging and paying respect, Parliament has now laid the foundations for healing to take place and for a reconciled Australia in which everyone belongs". However, Calma did note that there were many recommendations in the Bringing Them Home report that, as of 2009, had not yet been implemented.

Senate consideration
Later that day, the Senate considered a motion for an identical apology. The Leader of the Greens, Senator Bob Brown, attempted to amend the motion to have it include words committing parliament to offering compensation to those who suffered loss under past indigenous policies, but was opposed by all the other parties. The original motion was passed unanimously.

See also

 National Sorry Day
 Reconciliation in Australia
 Redfern Park speech

References

Further reading
 Footage of the National Apology to the Stolen Generations
 Footage of the National Apology to the Stolen Generations, with Kevin Rudd's subsequent speech
 Stolen Generation apology text
 Apology to Australia's Indigenous peoples from the Australian Institute of Aboriginal and Torres Strait Islander Studies

External links 

 Apology Project digital stories, State Library of Queensland. Digital stories recording responses to Rudd's apology speech.
 Cairns, Cooktown and Hope Vale Apology Digital Stories, State Library of Queensland. As part of the Regional Apology Project, these 11 digital stories capture the responses of Indigenous people living in Northern Queensland to Rudd's apology speech.

Institutional abuse
 
Human rights abuses in Australia